Group G of the 2019 FIBA Basketball World Cup was the group stage of the 2019 FIBA Basketball World Cup for the , ,  and . Each team played each other once, for a total of three games per team, with all games played at Shenzhen Bay Sports Centre, Shenzhen. After all of the games were played, the top two teams with the best records qualified for the Second round and the bottom two teams played in the Classification Round.

Teams

Standings

Games
All times are local (UTC+8).

Dominican Republic vs. Jordan
This was the first competitive game between the Dominican Republic and Jordan.

France vs. Germany
This was the second game between Germany and France in the World Cup. The French won in 2006. The Germans won in EuroBasket 2017, the last competitive game between the two teams.

Germany vs. Dominican Republic
This was the first competitive game between Germany and the Dominican Republic.

Jordan vs. France
This was the first competitive game between Jordan and France.

Germany vs. Jordan
This was the second competitive game between the Germany and Jordan.

Dominican Republic vs. France
This was the first competitive game between the Dominican Republic and France.

References

External links

2019 FIBA Basketball World Cup
2019 in Dominican Republic sport
2018–19 in French basketball
2018–19 in German basketball